Magnus Lennart Eriksson (born 8 April 1990) is a Swedish professional footballer who plays as a midfielder for Djurgårdens IF in Allsvenskan.

Club career

AIK
Eriksson started his career in the academy at AIK. He was promoted to the first team in 2006 under the management of Rikard Norling. However Eriksson never appeared competitively for the club. After two seasons in 2006 and 2007 without any league appearances Eriksson was sent on loan to two geographically close clubs Akropolis IF, then in Division 2 and FC Väsby United then in Superettan. During these two loan spells Eriksson finally acquired playing time in league football. Väsby United eventually made the loan spell permanent in 2009. Eriksson spent an additional two seasons at the club. He scored 11 goals in 29 matches for the club during the 2010 Superettan season.

Åtvidabergs FF

Eriksson transferred from Väsby United to fellow Superettan club Åtvidabergs FF before the 2011 Superettan season. The season proved to be a success for both Eriksson and Åtvidaberg as he scored 15 goals in 30 matches, finishing as third best goal scorer in the league and helping the club win the title and secure promotion to Allsvenskan. For the 2012 Allsvenskan season Eriksson managed to score 11 goals in 20 matches before eventually being sold to the Belgian club Gent during the 2012 summer transfer window.

Gent
On 21 August 2012, it was announced that Eriksson had transferred to K.A.A. Gent in the Belgian Pro League. He only made four league appearances for the club during the 2012–13 season. The club had three different managers during the season and Eriksson gained limited playing time.

Malmö FF

On 21 January 2013, Eriksson joined Allsvenskan club Malmö FF on a four-year contract. Eriksson acknowledged that a deciding factor in his transfer was the fact that his former manager Rikard Norling, then manager at Malmö FF, had contacted him personally and expressed his interest in Eriksson joining the club. Eriksson enjoyed a very successful first season at Malmö FF as he became the club's top scorer and top assisting player during the 2013 season. Eriksson scored 11 goals in 30 league matches and provided the club with 14 assists which was the highest number in the 2013 Allsvenskan. He also played all matches for the club during the qualification stage for the 2013–14 UEFA Europa League and scored two goals. During the first part of the season he played together with Tokelo Rantie and then later with homecoming Guillermo Molins as Rantie was sold during the summer transfer window. For his performances during the season, he was nominated to both forward of the year and most valuable player of the year, but ultimately lost both in favour of IFK Göteborg's Tobias Hysén. In the following season Eriksson played a vital part of the team that defended the league title and qualified for the group stage of the 2014–15 UEFA Champions League. He made 30 league appearances, scoring five times. Eriksson also participated in eleven of Malmö FF's matches in the 2014–15 UEFA Champions League. He won the award for goal of the year at Fotbollsgalan for his goal against Red Bull Salzburg on 27 August 2014.

Guizhou Renhe
On 15 December 2014, the transfer of Eriksson to Chinese Super League side Guizhou Renhe was announced. The transfer went through on 1 January 2015 when the Chinese transfer window opened.

Brøndby IF
On 10 July 2015, it was announced that Eriksson had transferred to Danish club Brøndby IF on a 4-year deal. In Brøndby Eriksson was used as a right midfielder.

Djurgårdens IF
On 16 June 2016, it was announced that Eriksson had transferred to Swedish club Djurgårdens IF on a 3.5-year deal. Since number seven which is Eriksson's number of choice was taken Eriksson was given number 77, last worn by Abgar Barsom in 2006. On 14 August 2016, Eriksson scored his first goal for Djurgården in a match against IF Elfsborg at the Tele2 Arena. During his first period Eriksson was used as a winger. Ahead of 2017, Eriksson had his shirt number changed from 77 to 7. During 2017, he scored 14 league goals to make him Allsvenskan joint top scorer for the season. Eriksson returned to Djurgården again on 21 August 2020.

San Jose Earthquakes
On 20 December 2017, the San Jose Earthquakes of MLS announced it had signed Eriksson as a Designated Player. He made his MLS debut on 3 March 2018, in San Jose's season-opening 3–2 victory over Minnesota United. Eriksson scored his first MLS goal, assisted by Danny Hoesen, in his fourth appearance, a 1–1 draw with the Philadelphia Union on 7 April 2018.

Return to Djurgårdens IF
On 21 August 2020, Eriksson returned to Djurgårdens IF for an undisclosed transfer fee.

International career 
Eriksson represented the Sweden U17, U19, and U21 teams a total of 21 times before making his full Sweden debut on 17 January 2014 in a friendly game against Moldova. He made his competitive debut for Sweden in 2022 FIFA World Cup qualifier against Kosovo on 9 October 2021, replacing Kristoffer Olsson in the 90th minute of a 3–0 win.

Career statistics

Club

International

Honours
Åtvidabergs FF
Superettan: 2011

Malmö FF
Allsvenskan: 2013, 2014
Svenska Supercupen: 2013, 2014
Individual
 Allsvenskan Midfielder of the Year: 2021
 Allsvenskan Player of the Year: 2021
 Allsvenskan Top assist provider: 2013, 2021
 Allsvenskan Top goalscorer: 2017
 Årets Järnkamin: 2017, 2021
 Swedish goal of the year: 2014

Notes

References

External links
 
 Malmö FF profile 
 
 

1990 births
Living people
Association football wingers
AIK Fotboll players
Djurgårdens IF Fotboll players
AFC Eskilstuna players
Åtvidabergs FF players
K.R.C. Genk players
Malmö FF players
Beijing Renhe F.C. players
Superettan players
Allsvenskan players
Division 2 (Swedish football) players
Division 3 (Swedish football) players
Brøndby IF players
San Jose Earthquakes players
Designated Players (MLS)
Belgian Pro League players
Chinese Super League players
Major League Soccer players
Swedish footballers
Swedish expatriate footballers
Sweden youth international footballers
Sweden under-21 international footballers
Sweden international footballers
Expatriate footballers in Belgium
Expatriate footballers in China
Expatriate men's footballers in Denmark
Danish Superliga players
Swedish expatriate sportspeople in Belgium
Swedish expatriate sportspeople in China
Swedish expatriate sportspeople in Denmark
Swedish expatriate sportspeople in the United States